Grether's Pastilles is a brand of glycerin-based pastille candies, distributed by Swiss conglomerate Doetsch Grether AG since 1930. Grether's come in four flavors: Original Blackcurrant, Blackcurrant Sugar Free, Redcurrant Sugar Free, Elderflower Sugar Free, and Blueberry Sugar Free.

The pastilles date back to 1850, developed and manufactured by family business Allen & Hanbury of London, and known as Allenburys Pastilles. After their introduction to Switzerland in 1910, they became a popular soothing remedy for sore throats and other minor throat related ailments. In 1930, Doetsch Grether AG acquired full distribution rights in Switzerland, and in 1974, took over the Allenburys name completely, transferring production to Basel, Switzerland. Coinciding with the company's acquisition of the product, its name was changed to Grether's Pastilles.

See also
 List of confectionery brands

References 

Brand name confectionery
Candy
Swiss confectionery